Leucoma cryptadia is a moth of the family Erebidae first described by Cyril Leslie Collenette in 1938. It is found in Sri Lanka.

Body white with bright yellow-orange labial palps and forelegs. Palps protrude beyond the frons. Antennae are darker than the orange areas.

References

Moths of Asia
Moths described in 1938